tert-Butyllithium is a chemical compound with the formula (CH3)3CLi.  As an organolithium compound, it has applications in organic synthesis since it is a strong base, capable of deprotonating many carbon molecules, including benzene. tert-Butyllithium is available commercially as hydrocarbon solutions; it is not usually prepared in the laboratory.

Preparation
tert-Butyllithium is produced commercially by treating tert-butyl chloride with lithium metal. Its synthesis was first reported by R. B. Woodward in 1941.

Structure and bonding

Like other organolithium compounds, tert-butyllithium is a cluster compound.  Whereas n-butyllithium exists both as a hexamer and a tetramer, tert-butyllithium exists exclusively as a tetramer with a cubane structure.  Bonding in organolithium clusters involves sigma delocalization and significant Li−Li bonding.  Despite its complicated structure, tert-butyllithium is usually depicted in equations as a monomer.

The lithium–carbon bond in tert-butyllithium is highly polarized, having about 40 percent ionic character. The molecule reacts like a carbanion, as is represented by these two resonance structures.

Reactions 
tert-Butyllithium is renowned for deprotonation of carbon acids (C-H bonds).  One example is the double deprotonation of allyl alcohol.  Other examples are the deprotonation of vinyl ethers.

In combination with n-butyllithiium, tert-butylllithium monolithiates ferrocene. tert-Butyllithium deprotonates dichloromethane:

Similar to n-butyllithium, tert-butyllithium can be used for lithium-halogen exchange reactions.

Solvent compatibility
To minimize degradation by solvents, reactions involving tert-butyllithium are often conducted at very low temperatures in special solvents, such as the Trapp solvent mixture.

Moreso than other alkyllithium compounds, tert-butyllithium reacts with ethers.  In diethyl ether, the half-life of tert-butyllithium is about 60 minutes at 0 °C. It is even more reactive toward tetrahydrofuran (THF), the half-life in THF solutions is about 40 minutes at −20 °C. In dimethoxyethane, the half-life is about 11 minutes at −70 °C
In this example, the reaction of tert-butyllithium with (THF) is shown:

Safety
tert-butyllithium is a pyrophoric substance, meaning that it spontaneously ignites on exposure to air. Air-free techniques are important so as to prevent this compound from reacting violently with oxygen and moisture:

t-BuLi + O2 → t-BuOOLi 
t-BuLi + H2O → t-BuH + LiOH

The solvents used in common commercial preparations are themselves flammable. While it is possible to work with this compound using cannula transfer, traces of tert-butyllithium at the tip of the needle or cannula may ignite and clog the cannula with lithium salts. While some researchers take this "pilot light" effect as a sign that the product is "fresh" and has not degraded due to time or improper storage/handling, others prefer to enclose the needle tip or cannula in a short glass tube, which is flushed with an inert gas and sealed at each end with septa. Serious laboratory accidents involving tert-butyllithium have occurred.  For example, in 2008 a staff research assistant, Sheharbano Sangji, in the lab of Patrick Harran at the University of California, Los Angeles, died after being severely burned by a fire ignited by tert-butyllithium.

Large-scale reactions may lead to runaway reactions, fires, and explosions when tert-butyllithium is mixed with ethers such as diethyl ether, and tetrahydrofuran. The use of hydrocarbon solvents may be preferred.

References

Organolithium compounds
Reagents for organic chemistry
Superbases
Tert-butyl compounds